The 2020–21 Virginia Tech Hokies men's basketball team represented Virginia Polytechnic Institute and State University during the 2020–21 NCAA Division I men's basketball season. The Hokies were led by second-year head coach Mike Young and played their home games at Cassell Coliseum in Blacksburg, Virginia, as members of the Atlantic Coast Conference. In a season limited due to the ongoing COVID-19 pandemic, the Hokies finished the season 15–7, 9–4 in ACC play, to finish in third place. They lost to North Carolina in the quarterfinals of the ACC tournament after earning a double-bye into the quarterfinals. They received an at-large bid to the NCAA tournament as the No. 10 seed in the South Region where they lost to Florida in the first round.

Previous season
The Hokies finished the 2019–20 season 16–16, 7–13 in ACC play to finish in a tie for 10th place. They lost to North Carolina in the first round of the ACC tournament. The tournament was thereafter canceled due to the ongoing COVID-19 pandemic. The NCAA tournament and all other postseason tournaments were also cancelled due to the pandemic.

Offseason

Departures

Incoming transfers

2020 recruiting class

Roster

Schedule and results

Source:

|-
!colspan=12 style=| Regular season

|-
!colspan=12 style=| ACC tournament

|-
!colspan=12 style=| NCAA tournament

Rankings

*AP does not release post-NCAA tournament rankings^Coaches did not release a Week 1 poll.

References

Virginia Tech Hokies men's basketball seasons
Virginia Tech
Virginia Tech
Virginia Tech
Virginia Tech